The 2007 COSAFA Cup was the 11th edition of the tournament. It was won by South Africa who beat Zambia 4-3 on penalties after a 0-0 draw after extra time.

Format
In the first round, 12 teams were divided into 3 groups of 4 teams each. Each group played a knockout tournament. The winners of each group joined Zambia (holders) into the final round.

First round

Group A 
played in Estádio da Machava, Maputo, Mozambique

Semi-finals

3rd/4th Places

Final 

 Mozambique advance to the final round

Group B 
played in Somhlolo National Stadium, Lobamba, Swaziland

Semi-finals

3rd/4th Places

Final 

 South Africa advance to the final round

Group C 
played in Botswana National Stadium Gaborone, Botswana

Semi-finals

3rd/4th Places

Final 

Botswana advance to the final round

Final round 
 Zambia qualified as 2006 COSAFA Cup winner

Semi-finals

Final

Top scorers
3 goals
  Paulin Voavy
  Teko Modise

2 goals
  Bino
  Brian Brendell
  Sello Muso

External links
2007 COSAFA Cup at RSSSF archives

Cosafa Cup, 2007
COSAFA Cup